William Kabogo Gitau is a Kenyan politician. He was the first and former governor of Kiambu County and a member of The National Alliance (TNA), one of the allied parties that merged to form The Jubilee Party.

He won the governorship in the March 2013 general election. He is the immediate former Juja MP, a seat he won in the 2010 by-elections, trouncing Alice Wambui of Kenya National Congress who was distant second, while the previous MP George Thuo of PNU was third.
In 2017, he lost the jubilee ticket and conceded defeat way before the results were announced.

In 2017, he was defeated by his rival Ferdinand Waititu in the nomination for the Jubilee gubernatorial ticket. Thereafter, he quit the Jubilee Party and declared that he would contest for the seat as an independent candidate but also lost to Waititu.

Early life and education

Born on April 4, 1961 in Komothai village in Githunguri, Kabogo attended St George's Ruiru Primary School, then Thika Technical School between 1975 and 1978 before joining Punjab University, India, for a bachelor of commerce degree.

Political career
Kabogo burst into the political scene in 2002 when he contested for the Kanu ticket for Juja Parliamentary Seat (Uhuru Kenyatta was then Kanu's presidential candidate) and lost to incumbent Stephen Ndichu. He immediately decamped to the little known Sisi Kwa Sisi party and went ahead to defeat Ndichu in the general elections. Kabogo unsuccessfully defended his seat during the 2007 when he lost the seat to George Thuo. He successfully petitioned the election of Thuo and when the by-election was called, he buried his political nemesis with a landslide victory on a Narc-Kenya ticket.

In 2013 Kabogo contested and won the Kiambu Gubernatorial Elections to become the 1st Governor of Kiambu County. In 2017, however, he lost the seat to Ferdinand Waititu after failing to grasp the Jubilee Party ticket, which then considered pivotal to the success of candidates, particularly in Kiambu County, Uhuru Kenyatta's backyard. In hindsight, therefore, his attempt to win the seat by contesting as an independent candidate was futile.

Potential misinformation on social media platforms. 
A false statement  was circulating on social media platforms that William Kabogo had conceded defeat in the May 2021 parliamentary by-election for Juja constituency. The statement was analysed by PesaCheck which is East Africa’s first public finance fact-checking initiative in collaboration with Code for Africa-the continent’s largest civic technology and data journalism accelerator who found out that the statement was FAKE.

External links
 Juja constituency profile
 William Kabogo Gitau - government profile

References 

1961 births
Living people
People from Kiambu County
National Rainbow Coalition – Kenya politicians
Members of the National Assembly (Kenya)
County Governors of Kenya
Panjab University alumni